Gretel is a German shortening of the given name Margarete.  

Notable people with this given name include:

A fictional character in the Brothers Grimm fairy tale Hansel and Gretel
Gretel Beer (1921–2010), Austrian-born English author of cooking books and travel reports and newspaper cookery writer
Gretel Bergmann (1914–2017), German Jewish high jumper who was prevented from competing in the 1936 Berlin Olympics
Gretel Ehrlich (born 1946), American travel writer, poet, and essayist
Gretel Killeen (born 1963), Australian presenter
Gretel Oberhollenzer-Rogger (born 1958), Italian ski mountaineer
Gretel Scarlett (born 1987), Australian actress
Gretel Tippett (born 1993), Australian netball player and former WNBL basketball player

See also
Gretl, an open source statistical package

German feminine given names